Olive Louise Wadham (née Joynes, 23 March 1909 – 20 October 2004) was an English freestyle swimmer who competed for Great Britain in the 1936 Summer Olympics. She was born in Christchurch, Hampshire and died in Bournemouth.

In 1936 she was a member of the British relay team which finished sixth in the 4×100 metre freestyle relay event. In the 100 metre freestyle competition she was eliminated in the semifinals. At the 1930 British Empire Games she won the gold medal with the English team in the 4×100 yards freestyle relay event.

References

External links
profile

1909 births
2004 deaths
People from Christchurch, Dorset
Sportspeople from Dorset
English female swimmers
Olympic swimmers of Great Britain
Swimmers at the 1930 British Empire Games
Swimmers at the 1936 Summer Olympics
Commonwealth Games gold medallists for England
European Aquatics Championships medalists in swimming
English female freestyle swimmers
Commonwealth Games medallists in swimming
Medallists at the 1930 British Empire Games